Michael Stevenson, better known as his stage name Mibbs (often styled MiBBs) is an American hip hop recording artist best known for his work with Pac Div, a rap trio from Southern California, and former signees of Universal Motown Records.

Career

Building off of his initial success with Pac Div, 2013 saw Mibbs grabbing the mic on his own. In an ever-changing industry, plagued by a formulaic approach, Mibbs looked the other way and broke fresh ground. With so much more to offer than just one "style", Mibbs played with varied musical influences and genres, pushing his audible vision past the current constraints in hip hop.

His debut EP, FREEBASS, premiered on Spin.com on June 18, 2013, and his first video, SUPWITHAT, directed by Travis Barker’s own Jayson Fox, premiered the following afternoon on BET’S 106 & Park. His second video, Rollin’, directed by feature film director, Tommy O'Haver, premiered July 2, 2013 on Billboard.com and his third video, Freebass, premiered on Hypebeast’s music website, Hypetrak.com. His solo buzz continued to grow with his now highly touted freestyle appearance on BET’s The Backroom in September 2013. The upcoming year brings five more EPs produced by WoodysProduce, rising Chicago star, producer/MC Tree G, house music veteran C Penn, and two of LA's best kept secrets - DertBeats and Mike Free, with features from Bad Lucc, Deniro Farrar, Boldy James, Polo Donatello and many more.

January 2014, Freebass EP was released on iTunes as FREEBASSkg featuring two new songs ("Mr. Knowitall" and "Offtop"). Additionally, The Program  A five-track EP with producer WoodysProduce, featuring Bad Lucc, Deniro Farrar and newcomer, Kentucky native, Polo Donatello were also released on iTunes.
A Deluxe edition featuring all seven tracks from Freebasskg is also available.

In November 2014, Mibbs song No New Leaders was featured on the soundtrack for Justin Simien's debut film Dear White People. The song is also played during the end credits of the movie.

Discography
 Freebasskg (2013)
The Program (2014)

References

External links
 Official Web Site
 Official Blog
 MiBBs on SoundCloud
 Mibbs on Twitter
 MiBBs on Facebook

Living people
Underground rappers
African-American male rappers
21st-century American rappers
21st-century American male musicians
Year of birth missing (living people)
21st-century African-American musicians